Glace is an unincorporated community in Monroe County, West Virginia, United States.

History
Glace was named after the blanket of snow, la glace in French, which the founders saw when they arrived at the community.

References

Unincorporated communities in Monroe County, West Virginia
Unincorporated communities in West Virginia